Lombard credit is the granting of credit to banks against pledged items, mostly in the form of securities or life insurance policies. The pledged items must be readily marketable; in particular, the securities 'eligible for collateral' which are registered on lists. Lending is via central banks. In the US, the Lombard rate (interest rate) has been at the top of the Federal Open Market Committee target range for the federal funds rate since March 16, 2020.

The pledging of securities means that the credit institutions have the opportunity of acquiring money in the short term from central banks.

Etymology 

The term comes from the Lombards, a people who conquered Italy in the 6th century, and settled in the northern region that became known as Lombardy. The wealthy cities in this region were the birthplace of modern banking, and many of their inhabitants became notable in Middle Ages throughout Western Europe as bankers, money-lenders and pawn-brokers; London's Lombard Street (1598) originally was occupied by "Lombard" bankers.

Controversy 

One prominent role of Lombard credit is in use by the Federal Reserve System of the United States of America. Traditionally, the discount rate, or the rate charged by the Fed to member banks in need of funds (ostensibly to maintain the required reserve ratio), was lower than the target federal funds rate, or the rate charged among banks for the same type of overnight credit. This meant that banks could borrow from the central bank at a lower rate than they could from each other, which somewhat conflicts with the central bank's role as a "lender of last resort". A discount rate lower than the rate typically charged by another bank opened the possibility of arbitrage and thus required extra scrutiny of potential borrowers. The Federal Reserve Board of the United States switched to a so-called "Lombard facility," in which the discount rate is actually higher than the targeted federal funds rate, thus creating an economic incentive for banks to look elsewhere before asking to borrow from the Fed.

A 2011 economic brief from the Federal Reserve Bank of Richmond said many bank executives and market participants perceive a stigma attached to borrowing from the discount window, so while the vast majority of federal funds loans occur below the discount rate (at or near the target federal funds rate), there have been instances when banks have paid above-market rates (particularly, rates at or even above the discount rate) for federal funds.

See also
 Bank rate
 Pawnbroker
 Repo

References

External links 
 Primary and Secondary Lending Programs - Federal Reserve

Monetary policy